Pyland is an unincorporated community located in Chickasaw County, Mississippi, United States.

A post office operated under the name Pyland from 1907 to 1942.

References

Unincorporated communities in Chickasaw County, Mississippi
Unincorporated communities in Mississippi